"The Hanged Man" is the pilot episode of the American TV series Da Vinci's Demons. It is directed by David S. Goyer and starring Tom Riley, Laura Haddock, Elliot Cowan, Blake Ritson and Lara Pulver. It is produced by Starz! Network and BBC Worldwide. The story is focused on Leonardo da Vinci and his two companions Zoroaster and Nico, who took Florence and established alliance with Lorenzo de' Medici.

Richard Edwards, from Games Radar, said it is an "odd mix of a Doctor Who historical episode and Game of Thrones; a hyper-real vision of history mixed with copious amounts of political sculduggery, nudity, sex and violence".

It received 1.042 million viewers in United States.

Plot
Lorenzo Medici gives Leonardo the contract to paint his lover Lucrezia, and he takes the opportunity to sell him his designs of airplanes, automatic load cannons and tanks. At the Carnival, Leonardo's mechanical pigeon flies and he has a sexual encounter with a masked Lucrezia, who's later revealed to be an agent of Riario and the Vatican. She tells the Pope about the weapons Leonardo is planning for Lorenzo and about his encounter with the Turk.

Cast

References

External links
 

American television series premieres
2013 American television episodes
Television episodes set in Italy
Alternate history television episodes
Starz Entertainment Group
BBC Worldwide